The Pottsville Commercial Historic District encompasses a small cluster of turn-of-the-20th century commercial buildings on East Ash Street in Pottsville, Arkansas.  It includes the 1887 former Falls and Sinclair store, and a block of three connected smaller brick buildings: the Pottsville Citizen's Bank (1913), and the Shue and Pryor stores, both built in the 1920s.  Pottsville has historically served as a commercial supply and business district for the surrounding agricultural areas.

The district was listed on the National Register of Historic Places in 2005.

See also
Pottsville Dipping Vat, located in a nearby park
Potts Inn, located adjacent to this district
National Register of Historic Places listings in Pope County, Arkansas

References

Historic districts on the National Register of Historic Places in Arkansas
National Register of Historic Places in Pope County, Arkansas
Commercial buildings completed in 1887
1887 establishments in Arkansas
Buildings designated early commercial in the National Register of Historic Places in Arkansas